Gregory Bernard Favors (born September 30, 1974 in Atlanta, Georgia) is a former American football linebacker in the National Football League. He was drafted by the Kansas City Chiefs in the fourth round of the 1998 NFL Draft. He played high school football at Southside High School in Atlanta and college football at Mississippi State.

Favors also played for the Tennessee Titans, Indianapolis Colts, Buffalo Bills, Carolina Panthers, and Jacksonville Jaguars. In 1999, the Titans made it to Super Bowl XXXIV in which Favors appeared as a substitute, however they lost to the Kurt Warner-led St. Louis Rams.

References

1974 births
Living people
Players of American football from Atlanta
American football linebackers
American football defensive ends
Mississippi State Bulldogs football players
Kansas City Chiefs players
Tennessee Titans players
Indianapolis Colts players
Buffalo Bills players
Carolina Panthers players
Jacksonville Jaguars players